Nedanamuiyeh (also Romanized as Nedānamūīyeh; also known as Nedenū’īyeh, Nūdūnū, and Zedenū’īyeh) is a village in Jorjafak Rural District, in the Central District of Zarand County, Kerman Province, Iran. At the 2006 census, its population was 10, in 4 families.

References 

Populated places in Zarand County